Papyrus Oxyrhynchus 300 (P. Oxy. 300 or P. Oxy. II 300) is a fragment of a Letter to a Relative, in Greek. It was discovered in Oxyrhynchus. The manuscript was written on papyrus in the form of a sheet. It was written in the late first century. It is not known where the document was distributed. The actual owner of the codex and place of its housing is unknown.

Description 
The measurements of the fragment are 116 by 108 mm.

The document was written by Indike to Thaisous about the dispatch of a bread-basket. It was published by Bernard Pyne Grenfell and Arthur Surridge Hunt in 1899.

See also 
 Oxyrhynchus Papyri

References 

300
1st-century manuscripts
Lost documents